A New Life is a semi-autobiographical campus novel by Bernard Malamud first published in 1961. It is Malamud's third published novel.

References

1961 American novels
Campus novels
Novels by Bernard Malamud
American autobiographical novels
Farrar, Straus and Giroux books